Bonnie Bartlett (born June 20, 1929) is an American actress. Her career spans seven decades, with her first major role being on a 1950s daytime drama, Love of Life. Bartlett is known for her role as Grace Snider Edwards on the Michael Landon television series Little House on the Prairie and as Ellen Craig on the medical drama series St. Elsewhere.  Her husband, actor William Daniels, played her fictional husband Dr. Mark Craig, and they both won Emmy Awards on the same night in 1986—becoming the first married couple to accomplish the feat since Alfred Lunt and Lynn Fontanne in 1965.

Early life
Bartlett was born in Wisconsin Rapids, Wisconsin, the daughter of Carrie Archer and Elwin Earl Bartlett, and was raised in Moline, Illinois. Her father had been an actor in stock productions across the country, but he gave up acting because her mother wanted to settle in Wisconsin. 

In 1947, she graduated from Moline High School.

Career

Bartlett studied acting with Lee Strasberg, and first got her start in television playing the heroine Vanessa Dale Raven on the soap opera Love of Life from 1955 to 1959, replacing actress Peggy McCay. She also had a previous role on the program, in which she briefly played the character of Ellie Crown, a role which was played for several years by Hildy Parks. She then moved on to night-time roles in the 1960s.

Her two most widely known roles were as Grace Snider Edwards on Little House on the Prairie from 1974-1977 and as Ellen Craig on St. Elsewhere. Each role began as infrequently recurring characters. As Grace Snider Edwards, her character's prominence in the series gradually increased from 1975-1977 following the courtship by and marriage to Isaiah Edwards, played by Victor French. In St. Elsewhere, she took on greater prominence in the 1984–1985 season when the storyline included Ellen and Mark's marital problems. The storyline deepened in the next season when their son was killed and they had to raise their granddaughter. Bartlett won back-to-back Emmys, and was made a contract player. Further difficult material included Ellen and Mark's divorce and slow reconciliation following the loss of their granddaughter in a custody dispute with her birth mother.  

For many years, Bartlett accepted only small guest appearances on such programs as The Golden Girls, Gunsmoke, The Rockford Files, and The Waltons.  Her acting career picked up considerably in the 1980s, including the TV miniseries V and North and South: Book II, as well as the pivotal role as the mother of Arnold Schwarzenegger and Danny Devito's characters in the 1988 film, Twins.

Bartlett and husband William Daniels made Emmy Awards history in 1986 when they became the second real-life married couple to win acting awards on the same night. Alfred Lunt and Lynn Fontanne first accomplished the feat in 1965. Bartlett and Daniels won for their portrayals of Dr. Mark and Mrs. Ellen Craig on the TV series St. Elsewhere. They later acted together again when she played a college dean who employed her husband's character, in a season of Daniels's ABC series Boy Meets World, and their characters later married.

When St. Elsewhere ended in 1988, Bartlett's career moved to a wide variety of guest-starring appearances, including major roles on Wiseguy as a tough and corrupt matriarch of a sewage business; as Andrea Drey, secretary general of the United Earth Oceans Organization  on seaQuest DSV; on Home Improvement as Lucille Taylor (Tim "the Tool Man" Taylor's mother); and on ER as Ruth Katherine Greene. Bartlett's last feature-film role to date was in Valediction.

Screen Actors Guild
Bartlett and Daniels both served on the Screen Actors Guild's board of directors.

Awards and honors
Bartlett was added to the Hall of Honor at her alma mater, Moline High School in Moline, Illinois.

Bartlett won two Emmy awards for her role as Ellen Craig on the television drama, St. Elsewhere. She was the best supporting actress winner in both 1986 and 1987 and was nominated as well in 1988. For the same role, Bartlett also won a Q Award in 1987 as the Best Supporting Actress in a Quality Drama Series.

Personal life
Bartlett met William Daniels, at Northwestern University. They were married on June 30, 1951.

In 1961, she gave birth to a son, who died 24 hours later. They adopted two sons: Michael, who became an assistant director and stage manager in Los Angeles, and Robert, who became an artist and computer graphics designer based in New York City.

Filmography

Film

Television

Book

References

External links
 
 
 

1929 births
Living people
American film actresses
American soap opera actresses
American television actresses
Outstanding Performance by a Supporting Actress in a Drama Series Primetime Emmy Award winners
People from Moline, Illinois
Actresses from Wisconsin
People from Wisconsin Rapids, Wisconsin
Northwestern University School of Communication alumni
20th-century American actresses
21st-century American actresses
Actresses from Illinois